Johann Friedrich August Breithaupt (May 16, 1791 – September 22, 1873) was a German mineralogist and professor at Freiberg Mining Academy in Freiberg, Saxony.

Biography
He was born in Probstzella. He received his doctorate at the Universities of Jena and Marburg. He studied under Abraham Gottlob Werner at the Freiberg Mining Academy where he received an appointment in 1813 as teacher and lapidary, and became professor of mineralogy after the departure of Friedrich Mohs in 1826. He held that position until 1866.

Research
He is credited with the discovery of 47 valid mineral species. The mineral breithauptite was named in his honor. His work included important contributions to crystallography and the physical and chemical properties of minerals. He developed the concept of mineral paragenesis.

Works
His publications include:
Ueber die Echtheit der Krystalle (1815, on pseudomorphs)
Characteristik des Mineral Systems (1820; 3d improved ed., 1832)
Vollständiges Handbuch der Mineralogie (1841)
Die Bergstadt Freiberg (1825; 2d ed., 1847)
Die Paragenesis der Mineralien (1849)

Notes

References
 

 

German mineralogists
1791 births
1873 deaths
University of Jena alumni
Scientists from Freiberg